Kuchum Khan (Siberian Tatar Köçöm, Russian: Кучум; died c. 1601) was the last Khan of Siberia who ruled from 1563 to 1598.

Kuchum Khan's attempt to spread Islam and his cross-border raids met with vigorous opposition from the Russian Tsar Ivan the Terrible (reigned 1547–1584), who sent a force of Cossacks to confront him head-on (c. 1580). Kuchum is particularly noted for the vigorous resistance he offered to the Russian invaders.

Background
Kuchum was the son of prince Murtaza from the Shayban dynasty (Şäyban) and a descendant of Hadji Muhammad.    In 1554, he contested the throne of the Siberia Khanate against the incumbents brothers Yadegar (Yädegär) and Bekbulat, who were both vassals of Russia. In 1563, Yadegar was defeated and Kuchum assumed the throne. In 1573, Kuchum conducted a raid on Perm. It was this and other minor raids which prompted the Tsar of Russia to support a Cossack invasion of Siberia.

War with the Muscovy

In 1582, the Siberia Khanate was attacked by the Cossack ataman Yermak, who defeated Kuchum's forces and captured the capital Qashliq. Kuchum retreated into the steppes, and over the next few years regrouped his forces. He suddenly attacked Yermak on August 6, 1584, in the dead of night, and killed Yermak and most of his army; regaining control of the now ruined Qashliq. Kuchum attempted to unite the rival factions within the khanate nobility but met with resistance. After an unsuccessful attempt on his life by Qarachi Sayet khan (Säyet), Kuchum was forced to move his horde to the steppe south of the Irtysh river. There he attempted to establish a new khanate, engaging in war against Russian governors.

In 1590 Kuchum raided the Tatars around Tobolsk who were paying yasak to the Russians. In 1591 Koltsov caught Kuchum on the Ishym River and captured two of his wives and his son Abdul-Khair who was later given estates in Russia. In 1594 the fort at Tara was built in part to control Kuchum who was in the area. In 1595 Kuchum's followers were raided on the upper Irtysh. In 1597 Kuchum asked for negotiations and the Tsar and Abdul-Khair wrote from Russia offering estates in Russia in return for surrender. Before September 1598 Andrey Voyeykov caught a large group of his followers at a place called Ub Lake and later caught Kuchum on the Ob River. Kuchum fled, but the Russians killed two of his sons and captured five other sons, eight wives and eight daughters. A Muslim cleric was sent to negotiate. Kuchum replied, describing himself as deaf and blind and without subsistence and said that he had not submitted before and would not submit now. This was his last contact with the Russians.  He is believed to have died c. 1605 in Bukhara. In 1620 his son Ishim-khan married a daughter of Kho Orluk who was then leading his people from Dzugharia to the Volga.

Kuchum is portrayed in numerous Tatar and Russian songs and legends. His descendants remained in Muscovy, eventually assuming the title of Sibirsky.

In 1591, Kuchum's son, Abul Khayir was the first of his dynasty to convert to Christianity. His conversion was followed by the conversion of his entire family who eventually assimilated into the Russian nobility. For instance, 
although Abul Khayir's son was known as Vasily Abulgairovich, his grandson's name, Roman Vasilyevich, could no longer be distinguished from a native Russian name.

In 1686, the tsar decreed that the dynasties of the ruler of Imeretia in the Caucasus along with the Tatar princes of Siberia and Kasimov were to be into the Genealogical Book of the Russian nobility.

In 1661 a man who was said to be a descendant of Kuchum fought the Russians in Bashkiria. In 1739, during the Bashkir War, Karasakal was said by some to be a Kuchumid.

References

16th-century births
1600s deaths
Year of birth unknown
Year of death uncertain
16th-century monarchs in Asia
History of Siberia
Khans
Khanate of Sibir
Tatar people
Muslim missionaries
Siberian Tatar people